The Mitsubishi X-2 Shinshin (formerly the ATD-X) is a Japanese experimental aircraft for testing advanced stealth fighter aircraft technologies. It is being developed by the Japanese Ministry of Defense Technical Research and Development Institute (TRDI) for research purposes. The main contractor of the project is Mitsubishi Heavy Industries. Many consider this aircraft to be Japan's first domestically made stealth fighter. ATD-X is an abbreviation for "Advanced Technology Demonstrator – X". The aircraft is widely known in Japan as  although the name itself is an early code name within the Japan Self-Defense Forces and is not officially in use. The aircraft's first flight was on 22 April 2016.

The success of this development test prototype has led to the start-up of the Mitsubishi F-X sixth-generation fighter program.

Development
At the beginning of the twenty-first century, Japan, seeking to replace its aging fleet of fighter aircraft, began making overtures to the United States on the topic of purchasing several Lockheed Martin F-22 Raptor fighters. However the U.S. Congress had banned the exporting of the aircraft in order to safeguard secrets of the aircraft's technology such as its extensive use of stealth; this rejection necessitated Japan to develop its own modern fighter, to be equipped with stealth features and other advanced systems.

A radio-controlled 1/5 scale model made its first flight in 2006 to gain data on performance at high angles of attack and to test new sensory equipment and self-repairing flight control systems.

Following these preliminary steps, the decision was taken in 2007 to push ahead with the multi billion-yen project. At the time of this decision, production was forecast to start roughly 10 years later, around 2017. In 2007, the ATD-X was expected to conduct its maiden flight in 2014. In 2011, the maiden flight was projected to take place in 2014 or 2015.

The 40 billion yen construction project in the Mitsubishi's Komaki South Plant began in 2009 under the supervision of the Acquisition, Technology & Logistics Agency (ATLA) of the Defense Ministry.  In July 2014, the TRDI (Technical Research & Development Institute) released the first official photos of the ATD-X prototype, and stated that the aircraft was undergoing ground testing. The fighter prototype was expected to be fully developed by 2018.  The ATD-X program will then lead to the Mitsubishi F-3, which should carry sixth-generation technology, and is expected to be produced in 2027.

The ATD-X prototype was officially unveiled on 29 January 2016. The aircraft's first flight was expected the following month; it carried the X-2 official military designation at the unveiling.

The X-2 made its maiden flight on 22 April 2016 taking off from Nagoya Airfield and landing at the JASDF's Gifu Air Field after a 26-minute flight. The unusually prolonged period between structural completion and first flight has not been fully explained.

In late-November 2017, ATLA announced that the X-2's testing will be concluded in March 2018. Of the time of the reporting the X-2 has completed 34 sorties out of the original 50 planned flights.

By July 2018, Japan had gleaned sufficient information from flight tests for a determination, and decided that it would need to bring on-board international partners to complete this project.  Several companies have responded.  Lockheed Martin is reportedly offering an updated version of the F-22 Raptor.  British based BAE Systems also entered talks about which little is yet reported.  Third to enter the competition was Northrop Grumman and there is speculation that it will offer a modernized version of the YF-23 to Japan.

Significance 
The X-2's development and maiden flight allowed Japan to become the fourth nation in the world to develop and test-fly their own stealth jet (after the United States, Russia and China), revitalize Japan's defense and aerospace industry, and stay competitive with regional powers China and South Korea that are also developing their own stealth fighter. Prior to the X-2 and the 2014 easing of arms export Japan's defense industry stagnated because of the arms export ban prevented Japan from exporting weapons or participate in any joint development with another country, with the exception being the United States. This in turn slows the growth of Japan's defense industry and similarly effects the aerospace industry as the lack of military aircraft development means that procurement of certain aircraft are sought elsewhere from foreign defense contractors. The X-2 is thus seen with potential to reinvigorate Japan's aerospace and defense industry. According to Hideaki Watanabe, head of the Acquisition, Technology & Logistics Agency (ATLA), the X-2 can be used to give Japan more bargaining power in future joint development projects because of its technological advancement. There is also potential that technologies developed from the X-2 can be transferred and used for civilian applications as the Mitsubishi F-2 has done prior. The F-2 (although its development is controversial) introduced the first usage of carbon fiber reinforced polymer (CFRP) and AESA radar on a fighter aircraft. CFRP material would later be used for the Boeing 787 Dreamliner and while the AESA radar technology would help produce electronic toll collection system.

Design

The X-2 will be used as a technology demonstrator and research prototype to determine whether domestic advanced technologies for a fifth generation fighter aircraft are viable. The aircraft features 3-D thrust vectoring capability. Thrust is controlled in the ATD-X by three paddles on each engine nozzle similar to the system used on the Rockwell X-31, while an axis-symmetric thrust vectoring engine is also being developed for the full-scale production model.

Among the planned features of the X-2 is a fly-by-optics flight control system, which by replacing traditional wires with optical fibers, allows data to be transferred faster and with immunity to electromagnetic disturbance.

Its radar will be an active electronically scanned array (AESA) radar called the 'Multifunction RF Sensor', which is intended to have broad spectrum agility, capabilities for electronic countermeasures (ECM), electronic support measures (ESM), communications functions, and possibly even microwave weapon functions.

A further feature will be a so-called , which will allow the aircraft to automatically detect failures or damage in its flight control surfaces, and using the remaining control surfaces, calibrate accordingly to retain controlled flight.

The X-2 was equipped with two IHI Corporation XF5 engines for the test flights.

To minimize its radar cross-section (RCS), the X-2's body is designed to have even surfaces and eliminate seam joints. The radiation-absorbent material (RAM) used on the body is reportedly a composite material consisting of ceramic and silicon carbide and is developed by Ube Industries, while the cockpit windshield is coated with a special tin alloy. The aircraft incorporates a serpentine shaped air intake duct to further suppress radar reflection. According to Hideaki Miwa of the Defense Ministry's procurement agency, the X-2's RCS is "no bigger than a giant beetle viewed from tens of kilometers away".

Specifications (X-2)

See also

References

External links

 ATD-X Full size model Technical Research and Development Institute Ministry of Defense
 Research of Flight Control System for High Maneuver Aircraft Mitsubishi
 Full size model on display in Japan International Aerospace Exhibition 2008 ASCII.jp
 Video of prototype takeoff on 22 April 2016

ATD-X
Stealth aircraft
Twinjets
High-wing aircraft
X-2, Mitsubishi
Aircraft first flown in 2016
Three dimension thrust vectoring aircraft
Japanese experimental aircraft